The , one of the largest land battles to be fought before World War I and the last and the most decisive major land battle of the Russo-Japanese War, was fought from 20 February to 10 March 1905 between Japan and Russia near Mukden in Manchuria. The city is now called Shenyang, the capital of Liaoning province in China.

Involving 610,000 combat participants and 164,000 combatant casualties, it was the largest modern-era battle fought prior to World War I, and possibly the largest battle in world history at that point.  The scale of the battle, particularly in the amount of ordnance being expended, was unprecedented in world history. The Japanese side alone fired 20.11 million rifle and machine gun rounds and 279,394 artillery shells in just over ten days of fighting (yet the Russians still fired more), matching the ammunition consumption of the German army in the entire 191-day Franco-Prussian War. The battle was a decisive strategic victory for the Japanese and, coupled with their victory at the Battle of Tsushima four months later, proved critical in ending the war in their favor.

Background
Following the Battle of Liaoyang (24 August to 4 September 1904), Russian forces retreated to the river Sha Ho south of Mukden and regrouped. From 5 October 1904 to 17 October 1904, during the Battle of Shaho, the Russians unsuccessfully counter-attacked, but managed to temporarily slow the Japanese advance. A second Russian counter-offensive, the Battle of Sandepu, fought from 25 to 29 January 1905 was likewise unsuccessful.

Though the combined Russian army led by General Aleksey Kuropatkin was set to receive reinforcements via the unfinished Trans-Siberian Railroad, the effects of the Bloody Sunday and the now-ongoing unrest at home placed a strain on the manpower of the whole Imperial Army as much of its resources now had to be dedicated in the quelling of the uprisings throughout its territories. Therefore, the Russian force was expected to receive little to no reinforcements and supplies from home.

The situation for the Japanese was hardly better. Though the capture of Port Arthur by General Maresuke Nogi freed up their 3rd Army, which then advanced north to reinforce the Japanese lines near Mukden in preparation for an attack, the manpower reserves of the Japanese army had been drained by February 1905. With the arrival of General Nogi's 3rd Army, Japan's entire fighting strength was concentrated at the vicinity of Mukden. The severe casualties, bitter cold climate, and approach of the Russian Baltic Fleet created pressure on Marshal Ōyama to effect the complete destruction of the Russian forces, rather than just another victory from which the Russians could withdraw farther into Manchuria.

Disposition of forces

 the Second Manchurian Army under General Baron von Kaulbars (who had replaced the unfortunate General Oskar Gripenberg), on the right flank in the west, on flat ground. 
 the Third Manchurian Army under General Baron von Bilderling, in the center, holding the railway and the highway. 
 the First Manchurian Army under General Nikolai Linevich, held the hilly terrain on the east flank. This flank also held two-thirds of the Russian cavalry, under General Paul von Rennenkampf. 
General Kuropatkin had thus disposed his forces in a purely defensive layout, from which it would be difficult to impossible to execute an offensive without opening a major gap in the lines.

On the Japanese side (Japanese Manchurian Army), 
 the Japanese First Army (General Kuroki) and 
 the Japanese Fourth Army (General Nozu) advanced to the east of the rail line,
 the Japanese Second Army (General Oku) advanced to the west. 
 The Japanese Third Army (General Nogi) was kept concealed behind the 2nd Army until the start of battle. 
 A newly formed Japanese Ōryokukō (Yalu River) Army under General Kawamura provided a major diversion on the Russian eastern flank. 
The Yalu River Army was much under strength, and consisted only of the IJA 11th Division (from Port Arthur) and reservists. Despite that it was technically not under the Japanese Manchurian Army but directly under Imperial General Headquarters to attack Primorsky Krai politically, the division was substantially under Manchuria HQ under the commander's decision.

General Kuropatkin was convinced that the main Japanese thrust would come from the mountainous eastern side, as the Japanese had proven themselves effective in such terrain, and the presence of the former 3rd Army veterans from the 11th Division in that area reinforced his convictions.

Field Marshal Ōyama's plan was to form his armies into a crescent to encircle Mukden, cutting off the possibility of Russian escape. He was explicit in his orders that combat within the city of Mukden itself was to be avoided. All during the war, the Japanese had pursued a meticulous civil affairs policy aimed at avoiding civilian casualties and keeping the Chinese populace on their side – a stark contrast with the previous First Sino-Japanese War and subsequent Second Sino-Japanese War.

The battle

The battle opened with the Japanese 5th Army attacking the left flank of the Russian forces on 20 February. On 27 February 1905 the Japanese 4th Army attacked the right flank, while other Japanese forces also attacked the Russian front lines. On the same day, the Japanese 3rd Army began its movement in a wide circle northwest of Mukden.

By 1 March 1905, action on the eastern and center fronts was largely static. The Japanese had made small advances but under heavy casualties. However, by 7 March, General Kuropatkin began withdrawing forces from the eastern front to counter the Japanese 3rd Army's moves on the western flank of Mukden, and was so concerned about General Nogi's movements that he decided to lead the counterattack himself. The shifting of forces from east to west was not well coordinated by the Russians, causing the 1st and 3rd Manchurian Armies to all but disintegrate into chaos. Then Kuropatkin decided to withdraw his troops north towards Mukden to face the Japanese forces head-on on the city's southwest and at the banks of the Hun River in the city's southeast.

Then Field Marshal Ōyama seized the chance he had been waiting for, and his orders to "attack" were changed to "pursue and destroy". Luck was further with the Japanese due to the late thaw in the weather. The Hun River, guarded by the Russian left flank commanded by Major General Mikhail Alekseyev, remained frozen, and was not an obstacle to the Japanese attack. However, as they crossed the river, the Japanese attack was hampered when they encountered stiff resistance and heavy artillery fire coming from the Russians, now commanded by General Paul von Rennenkampf, resulting in yet more heavy casualties. After heavy fighting the Japanese succeeded in taking the northern bank of the river, causing the Russian defense lines defending the bank to collapse and the far edge of their left flank to be partially cut off from the rest of the main body of Kuropatkin's army. At the same time a salient was formed just 15 kilometers west of Mukden, enabling the Japanese to totally encircle the Russians on their right flank in the process.

All but encircled and with no hope for victory, General Kuropatkin gave the order to retreat to the north at 18:45 on 9 March. The Russian withdrawal was complicated by General Nozu's breach through Russian rearlines over the Hun River. 

At 10:00 AM on 10 March, Japanese forces occupied Mukden. After they occupied Mukden the Japanese continued their hard-driven pursuit of the Russians, but this was hampered when Ōyama knew that his army's supply lines were stretching too thin; however, he continued the pursuit of the enemy, though in a lazy, slow manner. The pursuit was stopped 20 kilometers short of Mukden, but the Russians were already fleeing farther north from Tiehling towards the Sino-Russian border at a fast pace, and the battle was over with the Japanese as the victor.

Throughout the battle, many foreign military observers were present in order to observe how the next great war might be fought. The Battle of Mukden heavily foreshadowed the tactics to be used in World War I.

Conclusion

Russian casualties amounted to nearly 90,000. The Russians had also lost most of their combat supplies as well as most of their artillery and heavy machine guns. Fearing further Japanese advances, General Kuropatkin ordered that the town of Tieling be put to the torch, and marched his remaining men 10 days further north to a new defense line at Hspingkai (modern Siping, Jilin province, China), where General Mikhail Batyanov (who replaced General von Bilderling as commander of the Third Manchurian Army) organized defenses against a possible renewed Japanese offensive. However, Kuropatkin did not hold this line for very long, and soon organized a complete withdrawal of Russian forces from the region. The Japanese forces suffered 75,000 casualties which included a higher percentage of killed and wounded over the Russians. The Japanese captured 58 artillery pieces.

No serious fighting on land occurred after this battle as both Russian and Japanese armies were exhausted from the conflict.

Aftermath 

With the defeat of the Russian Manchurian Army in Mukden, the Russian forces were driven out of southern Manchuria. However, with problems concerning its overstretched supply lines, the Japanese army failed to destroy the Russian forces stationed in the region completely and Kuropatkin's forces, though severely demoralized and short of supplies, were still largely intact. But the battle of Mukden was decisive enough to shatter the Russians' morale and, with the unfinished Trans-Siberian railroad now in Japanese hands, undermined the tsarist government's war effort. The final, decisive battle of the war would be eventually fought on the waters of Tsushima.

The victory shocked the imperial powers of Europe, as the Japanese proved overwhelming throughout the battle despite the Russians having more manpower and materiel. It showed that European armies were not automatically superior to those of other nations, and could be even decisively outmatched in battle. The battle had confirmed the Japanese army the 6th largest army in the world. 
Tsar Nicholas II was particularly shocked, when the news reached the palace in St. Petersburg, that the tiny Asian island nation of Japan - approximately 2% of Russia's landmass - could defeat the powerful and huge Russian empire.
The tsarist government was irritated over the incompetence and clumsiness of their commanders during the battle. The generals Aleksandr Samsonov and Paul von Rennenkampf began to loathe each other as Samsonov very publicly accused von Rennenkampf of failing to assist him. In World War I these Generals would command the two armies involved in the even more disastrous Battle of Tannenberg.

See also
Honghuzi

Citations

References and further reading

 
Connaughton, Richard (2003). Rising Sun and Tumbling Bear. Cassell. 
 Higgins, David R. "The Battle of Mukden: A Strategic & Tactical Analysis-The rising empire of Japan defeated the Russians in what was then the largest land battle ever fought." Strategy and Tactics 270 (2011): 26+.
Kowner, Rotem (2006). Historical Dictionary of the Russo-Japanese War. Scarecrow. 
Martin, Christopher. The Russo-Japanese War. Abelard Schuman. 
Menning, Bruce W. Bayonets before Battle: The Imperial Russian Army, 1861–1914. Indiana University 
Nish, Ian (1985). The Origins of the Russo-Japanese War. Longman. 

Conflicts in 1905
Mukden
Military history of Manchuria
History of Shenyang
1905 in Japan
1905 in the Russian Empire
Mukden
Mukden